The Church of the Nativity of Christ, also known as The Old Church, is a Serbian Orthodox church building located in Pirot in the district of the same name in southeastern Serbia. It is listed as a Protected Monument of Culture.

Description
The church was built in 1834 and consecrated by Eparchy of Niš bishop Jeronim. The construction was managed by architect Andrey Damyanov, who also built churches in Niš, Skopje, Vranje, Smederevo and Mostar.

The church is slightly below ground level and can be reached through a downward stairway. This is a result of the Ottoman laws that forbade the churches to be higher than the Turkish mosque. The Church of the Nativity is 22 meters long, 13 meters wide and 10 meters high.

References

Serbian Orthodox church buildings in Serbia
19th-century Serbian Orthodox church buildings
Churches completed in the 1830s
Buildings and structures in Pirot
Protected Monuments of Culture